Women's association football  is a largely amateur sport in Mexico, given the greater emphasis of the male competitions.

History

The second Unofficial World Championships with women's national football teams was hosted by Mexico in 1971. Recently, the game has grown in the country with the introduction of a women's professional league. The final was won by Denmark was played at Estadio Azteca, in front of 112,500 attendees.

Domestic League

Liga MX Femenil is the national women's football in Mexico which began in 2016. Liga Mexicana de Fútbol Femenil was a previous attempt to grow women's soccer in Mexico.

National team

The national team has qualified for the World Cup three times: in 1999, 2011, and 2015.  Many of their players have American heritage.

References 

 
Football in Mexico